Manuel Dienavorian Lacherian (born 14 March 1938) is a Uruguayan chess player with Armenian origin, two-times Uruguayan Chess Championship winner (1980, 1987).

Biography
From the end-1960s to the end-1980s Manuel Dienavorian Lacherian was one of Uruguayan leading chess players. He won seven medals in Uruguayan Chess Championships: 2 gold (1980, 1987), 4 silver (1968, 1971, 1974, 1979) and bronze (1988). In 1981, in San Pedro de Jujuy Manuel Dienavorian Lacherian participated in Pan American Chess Championships.

Manuel Dienavorian Lacherian played for Uruguay in the Chess Olympiads:
 In 1976, at second reserve board in the 22nd Chess Olympiad in Haifa (+4, =3, -2),
 In 1978, at second board in the 23rd Chess Olympiad in Buenos Aires (+3, =7, -2),
 In 1982, at second board in the 25th Chess Olympiad in Lucerne (+4, =5, -2),
 In 1988, at third board in the 28th Chess Olympiad in Thessaloniki (+4, =5, -2).

Manuel Dienavorian Lacherian played for Uruguay in the Pan American Team Chess Championships:
 In 1971, at fourth board in the 1st Panamerican Team Chess Championship in Tucuman (+1, =5, -0),
 In 1987, at first board in the 3rd Panamerican Team Chess Championship in Junín (+0, =3, -4).

References

External links

Manuel Dienavorian Lacherian chess games at 365chess.com

1938 births
Living people
Uruguayan people of Armenian descent
Uruguayan chess players
Chess Olympiad competitors
20th-century chess players